The 1986 BYU Cougars football team represented Brigham Young University as a member of the Western Athletic Conference (WAC) during the 1986 NCAA Division I-A football season. Led by 15th-year head coach LaVell Edwards, the Cougars compiled a record of 8–5 overall and 6–2 in conference play, placing second in the WAC. BYU was invited to the Freedom Bowl, where the Cougars lost to UCLA.

Schedule

Roster

Season summary

at Washington

Utah

San Diego State

Air Force

vs. UCLA (Freedom Bowl)

References

BYU
BYU Cougars football seasons
BYU Cougars football